Bank of the Lao P.D.R., located in Vientiane, is the central bank of Laos. It is also the bank of last resort, controlling the money supply, managing the country's reserves, and supervising the commercial banks operating in Laos.

The bank is managed by an executive board, a governor and a deputy governor. The current governor is Xonexay Sithphaxay.

Governors
 Managing director of the National Bank (1975–1983)
Thongchanh Uparavanh, 2 December 1975 – 1977
Nouphanh Sithphasai, 1978–1980
Khamphoui Keoboualapha, 1980 (3 months)
Soth Phetrasy, 1980–1983

 Chairman of the State Bank (1983–1990)
Bousabong Souvannavong, 1983–1987
Nouphanh Sithphasai, 1987–1988
Pany Yathotou, 1988–1990

 Governor of the State Bank (1990–present)
Pany Yathotou, 1990–1992
Bousabong Souvannavong, 1993–1994
Pany Yathotou, 1995–1997
Cheuang Sombounkhanh, 1997–1999
Soukanh Mahalath, 1999–2001
Phoupheth Khamphounevong, 2001–2002 (acting)
Chanhsy Phosikham, 25 April 2002 – 1 February 2003
Phoumy Thipphavone, 21 February 2003 – 2005
Phoupheth Khamphounevong, 2006–2009
Somphao Phaysith, 2009–2018
Xonexay Sithphaxay, 2018–incumbent
Source:

Lao PDR Kip (1979)
On 16 December 1979, the old Pathet Lao “Liberation” kip was replaced by the new Lao kip at a rate of 100 to 1.

Coins
Coins were again issued in Laos for the first time in 28 years in 1980 with denominations of 10, 20 and 50 att, with each being struck in aluminum and depicting the state emblem on the obverse and agricultural themes on the reverse. These were followed by commemorative 1, 5, 10, 20 and 50 kip in 1985 for the 10 year anniversary of the Lao People's Democratic Republic. However, due to the economic toll of the Soviet collapse in 1991 and the persistence of chronic inflation, there are no coins currently in circulation in Laos.

Banknotes
In 1979, banknotes were introduced in denominations of 1, 5, 10, 20, 50 and 100 kip. 500 kip notes were added in 1988, followed by 1000 kip in 1992, 2000 and 5000 kip in 1997, 10,000 and 20,000 kip in 2002 and 50,000 kip on January 17, 2006 (although dated 2004). On November 15, 2010, a 100,000 kip banknote was issued to commemorate the 450th anniversary of the founding of the capital, Vientiane and the 35th anniversary of the establishment of the Lao People's Democratic Republic. Kaysone Phomvihane is pictured on the obverse of the 2,000, 5,000, 10,000, 20,000, 50,000, and 100,000 kip banknotes.

The Bank of Laos governor announced on January 25, 2012, that the Bank of Laos would issue 100,000 Kip banknotes as a regular issue on February 1, 2012 (but dated 2011) to encourage Lao people to use the national currency instead of U.S. dollars and Thai baht.

See also
Ministry of Finance (Laos)

References

External links 

 

Government of Laos
Economy of Laos
Laos
Vientiane
Banks established in 1968
1968 establishments in Laos
Banks of Laos